This is a list of governors of the Corpus separatum of Fiume (formally known as City of Fiume and its district), heads of state of the Free State of Fiume and prefects of the Province of Fiume (now modern Rijeka and its surrounding area, in Croatia).

List

(Dates in italics indicate de facto continuation of office)

External links
World Statesmen – Croatia (Fiume/Rijeka)

Fiume
History of Rijeka
Fiume, Governors and heads of state of
Fiume, Governors and heads of state of
Fiume, Governors and heads of state of